Delia Vaudan was an Italian luger who competed from the late 1970s to the early 1990s. A natural track luger, she won four medals in the women's singles at the FIL World Luge Natural Track Championships with one three golds (1979, 1980, and 1984) and one silver (1986).

Vaudan also won six medals at the FIL European Luge Natural Track Championships with four golds (1981, 1985, 1987, 1989) and two bronzes (1983, 1991).

References

Italian female lugers
Living people
Year of birth missing (living people)